Ian MacKenzie or McKenzie may refer to:

 Ian Alistair Mackenzie (1890–1949), Canadian parliamentarian
 Ian MacKenzie (swimmer) (born 1953), Canadian former swimmer
 Iain McKenzie (born 1959), Scottish Labour politician
 Ian Mackenzie-Kerr (1929–2005), British book designer
 Ian Clayton Mackenzie (1909–2009), British diplomat
 Ian MacKenzie (footballer) (1950–2018), English footballer